The 2007 FIA GT Monza 2 Hours was the fourth round of the 2007 FIA GT Championship season.  It took place at Autodromo Nazionale Monza on June 24, 2007.

Official results
Class winners in bold.  Cars failing to complete 75% of winner's distance marked as Not Classified (NC).  Cars with a C under their class are running in the Citation Cup, with the winner marked in bold italics.

Statistics
 Pole Position – #33 JetAlliance Racing – 1:44.945
 Average Speed – 190.48 km/h

External links
 Official FIA GT website – Race Results

M
FIA GT Monza